Vijay Singh (6 November 1729 – 17 July 1793), was the Maharaja of the Kingdom of Marwar. He ruled 21 September 1752 – 31 January 1753, and September 1772 – 17 July 1793. 

He succeeded following the death of his father Bakht Singh, on 21 September 1752. He recovered Ajmer for a brief period and seized Godwar (from Mewar) and Umerkot from the Sodha clan. 

On 31 January 1753, he was deposed by his cousin Ram Singh. He reascended the gadi for the second time after the death of Ram Singh in 1772. The Marathas under Mahadaji Scindia took advantage of the instability in Marwar. Mahadaji's first invasion in Tunga was a failure but he was able to decisively defeat the Rajputs in Patan and Merta. The Rajputs were no match for the European armed and French trained sepoys under Benoit De Boigne, his European tactics were far superior to the traditional Indian warfare that the Rajputs followed.

Vijay Singh tried to push the Maratha marauders out but was defeated by Mahadaji Scindia. These defeats led to Marwar's bankruptcy and many internal rebellions by the Marwari nobles. Ultimately this led to Marwar accepting British suzerainty in 1818.

Death and succession
Vijay Singh wanted his grandson Man Singh to succeed him. But after Vijay Singh's death on 17 July 1793, a civil war once again started in Jodhpur between his sons and grandsons. Bhim Singh usurped the throne but could never consolidate his rule.

See also
Rulers of Marwar

1729 births
1793 deaths
Monarchs of Marwar